Cuadrilla may refer to:
 a group of friends in Basque culture
 a company of people participating in a Spanish festival
 one of the four divisions of the Mesta sheep owners council
 an armed party of the Santa Hermandad
 the bullfighting team of a matador and his banderilleros and picadors
 a territorial division of Álava
 La Cuadrilla, a group of Spanish cinema directors
 Cuadrilla Resources, a British drilling and fracking company

See also 
 Quadrille
 Cadre (disambiguation)